The Clue of the Silver Key is a 1930 thriller novel by the British writer Edgar Wallace.

Surefoot Smith of Scotland Yard is called in to investigate when petty thief Tom Tickler is killed and left in a taxi with £100 in his pocket. His discoveries eventually lead him towards the mysterious businessman Washington Wirth.

Adaptation
In 1961 it was made into a film Clue of the Silver Key directed by Gerard Glaister and starring Bernard Lee and Finlay Currie. It was made as part of the Edgar Wallace Mysteries film series produced by Anglo-Amalgamated.

References

Bibliography
 Goble, Alan. The Complete Index to Literary Sources in Film. Walter de Gruyter, 1999.
 Kiddle, Charles. A Guide to the First Editions of Edgar Wallace. Ivory Head Press, 1981.

External links
 

1930 British novels
British crime novels
British thriller novels
British novels adapted into films
Hodder & Stoughton books
Novels by Edgar Wallace
Novels set in London
Doubleday, Doran books